Park Hyo-jin (born December 28, 1981), better known by her stage name Narsha, is a South Korean singer and actress. She is best known as a member of the South Korean girl group Brown Eyed Girls. Her stage name, Narsha, is derived from the term na-reu-sha, which means 'to fly up' in Middle Korean and was given to her by a former manager.

Career

Debut with Brown Eyed Girls

She became a member of Brown Eyed Girls after a suggestion by JeA, who had been her friend since their high-school years. The four members held several small size concerts, and considered names like "Crescendo" or "Dark Angel" before officially debuting as "Brown Eyed Girls". After more than 3 years of training in singing and holding several small size concerts, the Brown Eyed Girls released their debut album Your Story in South Korea in February 2006, with the ballad track, "Come Closer" as their single.

M&N
After Brown Eyed Girls' Kill Bill activities in 2013, the first BEG unit was announced. Miryo and Narsha formed M&N. The original name was '언니둘' (Two Sisters) and it was suggested that if JeA were to join them, they would switch their name to '언니들' (The Sisters).

M&N was introduced as a hip hop group as both Miryo and Narsha are avid fans of the Hip Hop genre, however their first digital single fell under the easy listening genre. The group has released a digital single named "Tonight" in both Korean and English.

Solo activities

Entertainer

During 2009, her popularity began to increase after she started appearing on many entertainment programs, including Heroes and Invincible Youth, on which she gained the nickname "Adult-dol" (성인돌). She became a DJ on Pump up the Volume (볼륨을 높여요) on KBS Cool FM, from 8 pm until 10 pm but due to Brown Eyed Girls' overseas promotions Narsha decided to leave the show, with her last broadcast on December 28, 2010.

She made her debut as an MC through OnStyle's fashion program, Style Show Fil on June 16, 2011. Narsha made her acting debut through MBC's drama series Lights and Shadows playing the role of singer aspirant Hye-bin, followed by Ohlala Couple as Moosan, the goddess of love. In 2012, she also provided the voice for the main antagonist The White Wolf in the Korean version of Christmas movie Niko: Santa Air Wing's Adventure. She has also made a name as a smartphone director, as well as a musical actress.

Solo artist 
Narsha announced her intention to make her solo debut in early 2010. Her first solo single, "I'm In Love", was released digitally on July 1, 2010, as a preview for her upcoming album. Her first solo studio album, the eponymous NARSHA, was released on July 8, 2010. The title song "Bbi Ri Bba Bba" charted on Gaon's Top 100 digital sales, most streamed and downloaded songs for 2010. The album contained a preview for "Mamma Mia", a collaboration with, at the time, fellow Nega Network group Sunny Hill, which was released fully on August 20. The album was also worked on by many composers who had contributed musically to Brown Eyed Girls' third album, Sound-G.

She was then featured on fellow member Miryo's track "Leggo", taken from her 2012 debut EP. The two later formed a duo called "M&N" and had already released a single, titled "Tonight" in 2013. Aside from this, she also lend her vocals for some drama's soundtrack. Narsha also appeared as a fixed member for the cast of Immortal Songs 2, however due to her musical schedules she had to leave the show at the end of 2013.

In February 2022, she renewed her contract with Steit Entertainment.

Filmography

Variety shows

Television drama

Movies

Web series

Musical theatre

Radio programme

Discography

Extended plays 
 Narsha (2010)

Singles

Soundtrack appearances

References

External links 

 

1981 births
K-pop singers
Living people
South Korean female idols
South Korean dance musicians
South Korean women pop singers
South Korean film actresses
South Korean television actresses
South Korean rhythm and blues singers
Brown Eyed Girls members